is a village located in Yamanashi Prefecture, Japan. , the village had an estimated population of 529, and a population density of 5.79 persons per km2.

Geography
Located in the northeastern corner of Yamanashi Prefecture, the village is very mountainous. An estimated 97% of the village is covered by forests. The village is located within the borders of Chichibu-Tama-Kai National Park.

 Mountains: Mount Kumotori, Mount Daibosatsu, Mount Hiryū, Mount Nanatsuishi, Iwadake
 Rivers: Taba River, Kaizawa River, Atoyama River
 Lakes: Lake Okutama

Surrounding municipalities
 Yamanashi Prefecture
 Kōshū
 Kosuge
 Tokyo
 Okutama
 Saitama Prefecture
 Chichibu

Climate
The village has a climate characterized by characterized by hot and humid summers, and relatively mild winters (Köppen climate classification Cfa).  The average annual temperature in Tabayama is 10.9 °C. The average annual rainfall is 1408 mm with September as the wettest month. The temperatures are highest on average in August, at around 23.5 °C, and lowest in January, at around -1.1 °C.

Demographics
Per Japanese census data, the population of Tabayama has decreased substantially over the past 60 years.

History
During the Edo period, all of Kai Province was tenryō territory under direct control of the Tokugawa shogunate. During the cadastral reform of the early Meiji period on July 1, 1889, the village of Tabayama was created within Kitatsuru District, Yamanashi Prefecture. Most of the land in the village has been protected watershed, providing water for the Tokyo Metropolis since 1901, under the control of Tokyo Metropolitan Government Bureau of Waterworks. Discussions have taken place to merge Tabayama with neighboring Kōshū, but were suspended in 2008.

Economy
The economy of Tabayama is primarily based on forestry and agriculture.

Education
Tabayama has one public elementary school and one public junior high school operated by the village government. The village does not have a high school.

Transportation

Railway
The village has no passenger rail service. The nearest train station is Oku-Tama Station in Okutama, Tokyo.

Highway

Notes

External links

Official Website 

Villages in Yamanashi Prefecture
Tabayama, Yamanashi